The FA Council consists of 92 elected representatives, from the FA Premier League, the Football League, County FAs, and the non-executive board of The Football Association. The council meets to decide the major policies of The FA, which is the governing body of English football.

Members of the FA Council
President
Chairman
Vice-Chairman
Life Vice-Presidents
Vice-Presidents
Divisional Representatives
Association Representatives
Representatives of The FA Premier League
Representatives of The Football League

Controversy
The British Government expressed concern in 2016 over the governance of the FA, which receives £30 million p.a. public funding, in view of the fact that only eight women and four black and ethnic minorities are on the 122 strong FA Council. A proposal for reform was tabled in February 2017 by Greg Clarke, Chairman of the FA. Mr Clarke has threatened to resign if his reform proposals are not accepted.

References

Council